The hybrid cultivar Ulmus × hollandica 'Etrusca' was first mentioned by Nicholson in Kew Hand-List Trees & Shrubs 2: 139. 1896, as  var. , but without description. The tree at Kew (see 'External links'), judged by Henry to be "not distinct enough to deserve a special name", was later identified as of hybrid origin, U. glabra × U. minor 'Plotii', by Melville.

Description
The Kew specimen was a small tree with ascending branches. Herbarium specimens show oval or near orbicular leaves (the latter with an abrupt, longish tip, without tapering), and a short petiole (see 'External links').

Etymology
The tree was possibly named for its resemblance to Tuscan cypress. Melville photographed a mature, roughly conical elm at Bulby, Lincolnshire, labelling the photograph U. glabra × U. plotii [:U.minor 'Plotii'], but the tree is otherwise unconnected with 'Etrusca'.

Cultivation
It is not known whether 'Etrusca' remains in cultivation.

Synonymy
 var. : Nicholson in Kew Hand-List Trees & Shrubs 2: 139. 1896.

References

External links
 "Herbarium specimen 295090, herbariaunited.org" Sheet labelled Ulmus montana var. etrusca (Kew Gardens Specimen, 1909; A. Ley)  
  Sheet labelled U. glabra etrusca (Kew Gardens specimen)

Dutch elm cultivar
Ulmus articles missing images
Ulmus